Auning is a minor town on the main road between Randers and Grenå, with a population of 3,061 (1 January 2022). It is located in Region Midtjylland and in Norddjurs Municipality. It used to be one of the two major towns in the abolished Sønderhald Municipality, the other being Assentoft which now belongs to Randers Municipality.

Notable people 
 Caspar Schrøder (1905 in Auning – 1989) a Danish fencer, competed at the 1936 Summer Olympics

References

External links

Cities and towns in the Central Denmark Region
Norddjurs Municipality